John Lane Gardner (1793–1869) served in the U.S. Army eventually achieving the rank of brevet Brigadier General after serving in the American Civil War having also served in the War of 1812, the Second Seminole War and the Mexican–American War. After Gardner retired from military service he devoted time to recruiting for the Army.

Biography
Born in Boston, Massachusetts, in 1793 during George Washington's second term Gardner joined the U.S. Army during the War of 1812 where he found his place as a career army officer. Just before the Civil War he was commander of the garrison at Fort Moultrie but was relieved of command because he undermined the plans of Secretary of War John B. Floyd, who would soon join the Confederacy, and was planning to place control of the forts in Charleston Harbor in Confederate hands. Gardner served over 40 years in the U.S. Army.

War of 1812

Gardner served during the War of 1812 and was appointed in the Army with the rank of Third Lieutenant, with the 4th Infantry on May 20, 1813. His first experience of combat was in Canada where he was wounded in the Battle of La Cole Mills on March 30, 1814,  while serving under General James Wilkinson. He served as aide-de-camp to Brigadier General T. A. Smith.

Seminole War
Gardner fought in the second Seminole War in Florida against the various Seminole Indian tribes between 1835 and 1839, including at the Battle of Wahoo Swamp on November 21, 1836. Shortly after the war, Gardner wrote and published the book Military Control in which he pointed out various faults with existing military organization and management.

Mexican–American War
During the Mexican–American War, Gardner served under Major General Winfield Scott. He was promoted to Major in 1845 and commanded the 4th Artillery Regiment from 1846 to 1848. He was stationed at Fort Polk in Texas between July 29, 1846, and January 31, 1847. He fought at the Battle of Cerro Gordo on April 18, 1847, and was brevetted as a lieutenant colonel "for Gallant and Meritorious Conduct". He served in the Battle of Contreras on August 20, 1847, and was brevetted as a Colonel for his role on August 20, 1847, also "for Gallant and Meritorious Conduct". At the Battle of Cerro Gordon he commanded a company of the 7th Infantry, many of whom were killed or wounded during combat. He was later praised by his commanders, including Scott in his report of April 23, 1847, for his signal services.

During the occupation of northern Mexico there were various mining operations in place. To prevent the fraudulent shipment of bullion to the Mexican or to other foreign governments Scott had it sent to the nearest assay office administrated through a system of permits from the local American commanders. In January 1848, Gardner oversaw these operations and enforced the collection of taxes on bullion as Superintendent of Assessment for the Federal District.

Civil War
As commander of Company A of the 4th U.S. Artillery Regiment, Gardner, along with Captain Abner Doubleday, his wife and Company E, arrived from Fort Capron, Florida, reaching their new post aboard the steamer Gordon on June 16, 1858, joining Captain Truman Seymour's Company H to jointly constitute Moultrie's new U.S. Army garrison. In August, yellow fever broke out amongst the companies of newly arrived artillerymen, infecting 49 and eventually killing 28. To reduce the possibility of further spreading of the epidemic, Washington authorized Gardner to temporarily move his command outside the fort into a healthier locale during the hot summer season. Subsequently, Gardner was absent from Fort Moultrie throughout most of the summer of 1859, scouting out potential arrangements around Smithville, North Carolina. Doubleday acted as commandant during Gardner's absence.

As commandant, Gardner took up residence with his family outside of the walls of the fort in a large house directly opposite the Western Postern-Gate. Living in the nearby community he could not take a very active or visible role giving aid to the fort fearing reprisal to his family and himself. On one occasion, when a secession meeting was taking place nearby, accompanied with threats and demonstrations, Gardner sent word to Doubleday to assume command of the fort at once in his place.  Although he was a Union officer, Gardner still held various southern sympathies and felt that the South had been treated unfairly in the question of territories and had been defrauded by the interests in the North. However, he acquiesced when it came to defending the forts in Charleston Harbor. During the months leading up to the Civil War Gardner, realizing that secessionist tensions were mounting, made several requests to President James Buchanan's Secretary of War, John B. Floyd, for troops to reinforce the garrison at Fort Moultrie on Sullivan's Island, but his requests were ignored. A southern sympathizer who was later indicted for conspiracy, Floyd had been going through great lengths to put the forts at Charleston Harbor in the hands of the South Carolinians. Instead Floyd, aware that armed conflict was imminent, only sent a company of about 70 men, most of whom were southern sympathizers, "for purposes of repairing, strengthening and making additions to the fort", the activity of which only rendered the fort much less defensible. The workers he sent to Moultrie were to be fed from existing provisions at the fort, which depended on Charleston for its supplies on a weekly basis. In the event of a siege the garrison could be starved out in a matter of days, as Floyd was planning for. Gardner had become suspicious of Floyd's planning and to avert any attempts to starve out the troops he wrote to an old friend, Colonel Joseph P. Taylor, in the commissary department, requesting provisions for one hundred men for six months and hinted that he could carry out the requisition in the normal line of duty without having to inform Floyd.

On November 8, 1860, Colonel Gardner ordered Captain Truman Seymour under his command to transfer arms from the Charleston arsenal to Fort Moultire but the news of the shipment somehow reached Charleston and was blocked by civilians. At the time Fort Moultrie was the only one of four forts in Charleston Harbor that was garrisoned. Floyd had sent an observer to check on the progress at the fort and found that Gardner and his men were working day and night to strengthen its defenses and had increased its supply of provisions and ammunition. Subsequently, on November 15, 1860, with tensions rising, Gardner was relieved of duty, as he was not cooperating with Floyd's plans to render the fort an easy target for the secessionists. Gardner was ordered to report to General David E. Twiggs, in Texas. Subsequently, he was replaced by Major Robert Anderson, who was chosen by Floyd on the pretext that he was younger but ultimately for diplomatic reasons, as Anderson was a former slave-owner from Kentucky and was married to the daughter of a famous Georgian politician and war veteran. He was once stationed at Fort Moultrie, knew many people in nearby Charleston and had a reputation as a military scholar and was once a staff member of General Winfield Scott. Floyd assumed incorrectly that by replacing Gardner with Anderson he would side with the Confederates should the forts come under siege by the South Carolinians.

Final years
After 40 years of consecutive service Gardner retired from active service on November 1, 1861.  After retirement he was involved in recruitment duty for the remainder of the war. In 1866, he was brevetted brigadier-general "for long and faithful service", with seniority dated from March 13, 1865. On August 30, 1866, he began serving on the Board for Retiring Disabled Officers, in Philadelphia.

Gardner died of pneumonia in Wilmington, Delaware, on February 19, 1869, and is interred in the cemetery at Immanuel Episcopal Church on the Green.

See also

List of American Civil War brevet generals (Union)
Battle of Fort Sumter
List of American Civil War battles
Bibliography of the American Civil War
List of American Civil War generals (Union)
List of American Civil War generals (Confederate)

Notes

References

Bibliography

, Book (par view)
, Book (par view)
, Book (par view)
, E'book
, E'book
, Book (par view)
, E'book

Primary sources
, E'book
, E'book

Other sources

External links

The Mexican-American War: Gardner military reports
Fort Polk

1793 births
1869 deaths
Union Army colonels
United States Army officers
People of Massachusetts in the American Civil War
People from Boston